The Independence Valley fault system is a group of interrelated normal faults located in northeastern Nevada in the United States. The fault system is characteristic of faulting throughout the Great Basin region.

See also
Independence Valley tui chub

References
USGS: Independence Valley fault system
M 6.2 - 8km ENE of Wells, Nevada – USGS

Geography of Elko County, Nevada
Seismic faults of Nevada